Virata (IAST virāṭa),  was the king of the Matsya Kingdom, in whose court the Pandavas spent a year in concealment during their exile. Virata was married to Queen Sudeshna and was the father of Prince Uttara and Princess Uttarā, who married Abhimanyu, the son of Arjuna. Abhimanyu and Uttara's son Parikshit succeeded Yudhishthira on the throne of Hastinapura, after the war of Mahabharata. He is the titular character of the Virata Parva, the fourth book of the epic Mahabharata

Life 
Virata was a good ruler. He was the incarnation of one of Maruts and his brother Sahtanika was portion of Mitra. married his commander-in-chief Kichaka's elder sister Sudeshna. Though he was a fierce warrior, he was afraid of Kichaka's might. So he obeyed all orders of Kichaka. He was warned by Kichaka that if he wouldn't obey his orders, he (Kichaka)  will destroy his whole kingdom. He was unable to stop Kichaka when he was insulting Draupadi in disguise of Sairandhari. After Bhima killed Kichaka, Virata became independent. He also insulted Duryodhana who was blaming Virata for Kichaka's death. When Trigarta's king Susharma attacked him on Duryodhana's order from another direction, he fought with him bravely but when Susharma was about to kill him, he was saved by Bhima. His daughter Uttarā was married to Arjuna's son Abhimanyu whose son Parikshita succeeded Yudhishthira's throne.

Role in the Kurukshetra War and death 
He supported Pandavas in the war. Before, the war Sahadeva preferred Virata to be the commander-in-chief of their army,  but Yudhishthira and Arjuna preferred Dhrishtadyumna.

On the first day, both his sons Uttara and Shweta were killed by Shalya and Bheeshma, leaving only Shankha. On the second day, an enraged Virata killed Shalya's son Madranjaya as revenge for Uttara. During the war, he fought Bheeshma several times. On the seventh day, he confronted Drona but his horses, charioteer, banner and chariot were quickly destroyed by Drona. Then, he ran towards his son Shankha's chariot. Together, they managed to stop Drona's onslaught and wounded him. An enraged Drona shot a poisonous arrow at Shankha, killing him instantly. Virata, having no more sons left, fled the battlefield. During the night battle of the 14th day, he was vanquished by Shalya and taken away from the battlefield. He was killed by Drona on the 15th day of the war. In a different version, he was killed during a Kaurava attack in the Kurukshetra War along with his sons.

See also
 Virata Kingdom

References

Swami Ramsukhdas: Shrimad Bhagvadgita - Sadhaka-Sanjivani, translated into English by S.C. Vaishya, Gita Press Gorakhpur, 

Characters in the Mahabharata